The 1978–79 New York Islanders season was the seventh season for the franchise in the National Hockey League. The New York Islanders finished first overall by one point over the defending Stanley Cup champions Montreal Canadiens in the regular season standings.

Offseason

NHL Draft

Regular season

Season Standings

Schedule and results

Playoffs

Round 1: (1) New York Islanders vs. (8) Chicago Blackhawks

New York Islanders Wins Series 4-0

Round 2: (1) New York Islanders vs. (4) New York Rangers

New York Rangers Wins Series 4-2

Player statistics

Note: Pos = Position; GP = Games played; G = Goals; A = Assists; Pts = Points; +/- = plus/minus; PIM = Penalty minutes; PPG = Power-play goals; SHG = Short-handed goals; GWG = Game-winning goals
      MIN = Minutes played; W = Wins; L = Losses; T = Ties; GA = Goals-against; GAA = Goals-against average; SO = Shutouts;

Awards and records
December 23/78: Bryan Trottier, Most Points, One Period, 6

References
 Islanders on Hockey Database

New York Islanders seasons
New York Islanders
New York Islanders
New York Islanders
New York Islanders
Patrick Division champion seasons
Western Conference (NHL) championship seasons